Failsafe Records is a record label that was founded in 1984 in Christchurch, New Zealand. It started a long line of releases, including a chain of compilations that featured many artists (notably JPSE, Double Happys, Nocturnal Projections and Loves Ugly Children) who later appeared on Flying Nun Records, major labels, or other larger indies.

History 
The label has recently released a string of 'collected works' discs in its Retrogenic Series, for artists such as Jay Clarkson and Breathing Cage, Pop Mechanix, Beat Rhythm Fashion, Children's Hour, Eight Living Legs, Dolphin and YFC.

Failsafe maintains a website which contains a large music history section on the local and New Zealand wide music scene, mostly centred on the early 1980s bands and where they went to.

The label had a big upsurge in the early 1990s with the release of its Avalanche Compilation featuring Loves Ugly Children alongside Pumpkinhead, 147Swordfish (featuring two members of Salmonella Dub and David Wernhan who went on to sculpt live sounds for Shihad and S Dub), Lurch and Supertanker. The label also released work by Christchurch moody pop band Throw, Malchicks and Squirm, and its genre encompassed indie guitar disc Good Things.

In 1995, the label went into hibernation before resurfacing in 2001 with releases from Degrees K, Substandard, Eskimo (now Kimo) and Hooster before launching in 2005 its Retrogenic Series of retrospective releases focusing on key overlooked bands from the past 25 years. Wave 2 of the Retrogenic Series is scheduled for 2008. The label continues to work as a completely independent label and distributor.

Retrogenic Series
The Retrogenic Series is a group of CD releases from the Failsafe Records. The initial imprint started in 2005 as part of Failsafe's 30 albums in 30 days project, an attempt to release one album a day for the month of May 2005, and attempt to clear the Failsafe Records archives of collected works at that time unavailable to the greater public.

This mostly consisted of music from important New Zealand post punk and alternative bands from the early 1980s to the 1990s such as Children's Hour, Eight Living Legs, YFC, Evasive Action, Southern Front, Newtones, Andriodss, Beat Rhythm Fashion, Pop Mechanix and Breathing Cage.

Many of these bands had sporadic recording works that were often left unreleased and unavailable to the public due to the lack of record labels willing to put money into financing local releases in New Zealand at the time, and the prohibitive cost to bands of undertaking pressings themselves.

The Retrogenic Series aims to collect, restore and master as much material as can be found by various important and under represented artists from the acknowledged well spring of innovation that happened in the 1977-late 1980s period that spawned the Flying Nun Records, Propeller Records and Ripper Records labels, along with Failsafe which started in 1983.

After the first wave of releases in 2005 the label continues to add new releases to the series as time and newly surfaced material allows. The project has continued and has taken 'requests' from music fans for artists they felt appropriate to the series.

See also
 List of record labels
 List of New Zealand record labels
 Music of New Zealand

References

External links 
 Failsafe Records Website
 Failsafe Records demonstration tapes at the Alexander Turnbull Library

New Zealand record labels
Record labels established in 1984
Indie rock record labels